Ahmet Önder (born 11 July 1996) is a Turkish artistic gymnast.  He represented Turkey at the 2020 Olympic Games.  He is the 2019 World silver medalist on the parallel bars.

Early life 
Önder was born in Ödemiş, Turkey in 1996.  He was inspired to try gymnastics after watching the 2004 Olympic Games on television.

Gymnastics career

2019 
Önder competed at various World Cups throughout the year.  At the European Championships he placed fifth in the all-around.  At the European Games he won silver on horizontal bar behind Robert Tvorogal of Lithuania.  In October Önder competed at the World Championships where he won silver on parallel bars behind Joe Fraser.  This medal, alongside İbrahim Çolak's gold medal on rings, were the first medals won by Turkish gymnasts at the World Championships.  Additionally, due to being a top-three finisher on an apparatus not part of a qualified team, Önder was able to qualify as an individual to the upcoming 2020 Olympic Games.

2020 
Önder competed at the Baku World Cup; however the competition was canceled after qualifications due to the COVID-19 pandemic.  Many other competitions were either canceled or postponed throughout the year.  In December the European Championships were held.  Önder helped Turkey win the silver medal behind Ukraine in the team competition.  Individually Önder placed fourth on floor exercise and eighth on vault and horizontal bar.

2021 
Önder competed at the European Championships where he placed fourth in the all-around and on floor exercise, fifth on horizontal bar, and eighth on parallel bars.  At the 2020 Olympic Games Önder qualified to both the all-around and vault event finals where he finished twenty-fourth and seventh respectively.  At the World Championships Önder finished fifth in the all-around, setting a record as the highest placing Turkish gymnast at a World Championships, beating his previous record of ninth set in 2017.

2022 
Önder started the year competing at the Osijek Challenge Cup.  He competed at the Mediterranean Games where he helped Turkey win gold in the team event.  Individually he won silver on floor exercise behind Nicola Bartolini and bronze on horizontal bar behind Marios Georgiou and Adem Asil.  Önder next competed at the Islamic Solidarity Games where he helped Turkey once again win gold in the team event.  Individually he won gold on floor exercise and horizontal bar, silver on parallel bars, and bronze on rings and vault.

In August Önder competed at the 2022 European Championships.  On the first day of competition he won silver in the all-around behind Joe Fraser.  He then helped Turkey win bronze in the team event.

Competitive history

References

External links 
 
 
 

1996 births
Living people
Turkish male artistic gymnasts
European Games silver medalists for Turkey
European Games medalists in gymnastics
Gymnasts at the 2019 European Games
Universiade medalists in gymnastics
Universiade silver medalists for Turkey
People from Ödemiş
Mediterranean Games medalists in gymnastics
Mediterranean Games gold medalists for Turkey
Mediterranean Games silver medalists for Turkey
Mediterranean Games bronze medalists for Turkey
Medalists at the 2019 Summer Universiade
Competitors at the 2018 Mediterranean Games
Medalists at the World Artistic Gymnastics Championships
Gymnasts at the 2020 Summer Olympics
Olympic gymnasts of Turkey
Gymnasts at the 2022 Mediterranean Games
21st-century Turkish people